Baseball is a bat-and-ball sport that has many recreational variants (sometimes referred to as diamond sports). The major sport most related to baseball is the Olympic discipline of softball, with the two sports being administered internationally alongside Baseball5 (invented in 2017) by the World Baseball Softball Confederation.

Many variations of baseball change the game significantly. For example, many variations are played informally, with less equipment/space requirements and a softer ball, and certain variations do not feature a pitcher, and/or have the batters hit the ball using their hands or feet, with failure to legally hit the ball on the first opportunity resulting in an automatic out. There may be a lack of baserunning, with base hits awarded according to the distance or number of bounces the batted ball takes before being fielded, and imaginary "ghost runners" advancing around the bases in lieu of actual runners. Other variations are even more loosely based on baseball, often involving the same scoring system applied to dramatically different contexts, such as playing darts.

There are also some bat-and-ball sports which are distinct from baseball, such as rounders, that strongly resemble it.

Historic variations

Massachusetts Game 
The Massachusetts Game (also known as "round ball" because it was played on a circular field) was a competitor to what would eventually become the basis for modern baseball, the "New York Game". Some major differences of this game from baseball are:

 The batter stood halfway between home plate and first base, with the pitcher only about half the distance from the batter as in baseball. 
 There was no foul territory, so the batter could hit the ball in any direction. 
 Instead of tagging runners, the fielders threw the ball at the runners in a practice that was known as "soaking" or "plugging".

Olympic sports

Softball 

Softball originated as a variation of baseball, and today is a very popular sport in its own right, with most of the rules remaining the same as baseball. Softball is administered at the international level along with baseball by the World Baseball Softball Confederation, with the two sports being treated as disciplines of the same overall sport when played at the Olympics. Alongside the Olympic discipline of fastpitch softball, which is the most popular variation of softball, there is also modified fastpitch softball and slow-pitch softball.

Baseball5 

Baseball5 (B5) is an international variation of baseball where the only equipment used is a rubber ball, and the field is a -square. Batters "self-serve" the ball, hitting it with a bare hand to start each play, with foul balls and out-of-the-park home runs not permitted. Each team has only five players and there are five innings in the game. It is scheduled to be played at the 2026 Youth Olympic Games, and is administered by the World Baseball Softball Confederation.

Informal variations 

These variations of baseball generally reduce the amount of equipment and space needed to play the game, and the ball is often softer to reduce the risk of injury. They may also be modified to work with fewer players; for example, some informal variations of baseball use the ghost runner rule, simulating having runners on base when a player must take their turn to bat. However, the basic structure of a pitcher throwing to a batter, with the batter hitting the ball with some type of bat, is retained.

Stickball 

In stickball, the bat is a broom handle, and the ball is generally a rubber ball or tennis ball. It is generally played as a street game.

Vitilla 

Vitilla is a variation of stickball played mostly in the Dominican Republic. Instead of a ball, a large plastic water bottle cap is thrown towards the batter, and there are only two bases to advance around before going to home plate. In addition, the strike zone is represented by a physical object behind the batter.

Little League Baseball 

Little League Baseball modifies some of the rules of baseball and softball to be more appropriate for children. It is played at an official level.

Wiffle ball 

Wiffle ball is played with a plastic bat and ball. The ball is designed to have more movement in the air, so that pitchers can more easily trick batters with different types of pitches.

Corkball 

Corkball does not feature baserunning: the value of a hit is measured by the distance traveled by the batted ball. The advancement of ghost runners placed on base is how runs are scored.

Games with no pitcher 

The following variations of baseball do not have a pitcher, meaning that the batter starts every play with possession of the ball. They may feature strikes, or the batter may automatically be out for failing to legally hit the ball into fair territory.

Tee-ball 

Tee-ball is a popular introductory variant of baseball for children, with the ball placed on a "batting tee" each time a batter is prepared to hit. The batter hits the ball off the tee to commence play. Older players may be given the opportunity to face some pitches from their coach, making it easier for them to hit the ball while still helping them to progress toward facing an opposing pitcher. Each inning may be played until three outs, or until all players on the offensive team have had a turn to bat.

Games with no bat 
The following games involve the use of either the hands or the legs in order to hit the ball.

Kickball 

Kickball is a popular variation of baseball, which involves batters kicking the ball with their legs. The ball is thrown underhand by the pitcher, and must roll to the batter.

Matball 

Matball, also known as Big Base, is a variation of kickball where multiple runners can be on a base, with the bases being large mats.

Variations of Baseball5 
Baseball5 is a variation of baseball which does not have several elements of conventional baseball, such as pitchers and bats.

Punchball 
Punchball/slapball is played with the hands: batters start each play off by hitting the ball into play using their bare hands. There is no pitcher.

Cuatro esquinas 
Cuatro esquinas (four corners) is a Cuban street game which inspired the creation of Baseball5.

Pelotica de goma 
Pelotica de goma is a Venezuelan street game which has been played for over 70 years.

Unorthodox variations

Over-the-line 

Over-the-line (OTL) is a variation requiring only three players per team, and is played without gloves in some gender/age divisions. The batter stands at the point of a triangle, with his goal being to hit the ball (pitched by a teammate) over the opposing line of the triangle without the ball being caught by a defender. The fair territory is designated by two parallel lines emanating at right angles from the two corners of the triangle away from the batter. There is no baserunning, with runs scored when there are either 3+ "base hits" (uncaught fair balls) in an inning, or a "home run" (a ball landing past the furthest fielder).

Stoop ball 

Stoop ball is a variation where the ball is thrown by the batter at the steps of a stoop (concrete stairway) with the goal of making the rebounded ball travel away from the fielders. Bases or points are awarded based generally on the distance or number of bounces the ball takes before it is fielded.

Beep baseball 

Beep baseball is generally played by visually impaired or blind players, using a ball that beeps so that it can be located more easily. There are "spotters" who assist the fielders by indicating which section of the field the batted ball has been hit into. The game is played to six innings.

Dartball 

Dartball is played using a dartboard, with the results of each throw of the dart relating to the rules of baseball. "Batters" simulate an at-bat, with the dart's landing position on the board determining whether they get a ball or strike, and whether they ultimately reach base/advance runners already on base.

Related bat-and-ball sports

Pesäpallo 

Pesäpallo, also known as Finnish baseball, was invented in the 1920s, with some of it being based on baseball. It has four bases placed at increasing distances between each other (such that the distance between 3rd base and home is greater than between home and 1st base.) The ball is pitched "vertically" to the batter (such that it is thrown upwards by the opposing pitcher at home base), and is hit as it lands. The game features a number of significant differences to baseball: it is not possible to hit out-of-the-park home runs, as these are considered foul balls, and batters do not have to run on fair contact, being allowed three chances to hit the ball (regardless of the result of each hit) before being forced.

Rounders 

Rounders involves a similar hitting of a thrown ball as baseball, with a "rounder" being scored upon rounding all four bases. There is no foul territory, so that the ball can be hit in any direction. It is popular in the United Kingdom among school children, having been played since the 1700s.

See also 

 Forms of cricket

References

External links 

 Australia Baseball5 Training Manual - features a number of training games and variations of Baseball5
 Official MLB List of Derivative Games of Baseball